The Palestine Hotel (Arabic: فندق فلسطين), often referred to simply as The Palestine, is an 18-story hotel in Baghdad, Iraq located on Firdos Square near from Saadon, across from the Ishtar Hotel. It has long been favoured by journalists and media personnel. The hotel overlooks the Tigris on its eastern bank and is located several hundred metres south of the Baghdad Hotel.

History 
The hotel was built in 1982 by the Iraqi government and managed by the French hotelier Meridien Hotels as the Palestine Meridien Hotel. UN-imposed sanctions following the Gulf War led Le Méridien to dissociate itself from the hotel, which was subsequently renamed simply the Palestine Hotel. Starting with the 1991 Gulf War and continuing through the 2003 invasion of Iraq, this was one of several hotels foreign media used to cover situations that developed in Iraq, and it survived explosive attacks by various parties.

April 8, 2003 incident 
A controversial incident occurred during the 2003 invasion of Baghdad. On April 8, 2003, an American tank fired a shell on the hotel, killing two journalists, Reuters cameraman Taras Protsyuk and José Couso of Telecinco Spanish television. Three journalists were wounded. One of the survivor journalists was Japanese Mika Yamamoto who died in Aleppo during the Syrian civil war on August 20, 2012.

On May 27, 2003, the Committee to Protect Journalists (CPJ) published a report of their investigation into the tank shelling of the Palestine Hotel on April 8, 2003.

After interviewing "about a dozen reporters who were at the scene, including two embedded journalists who monitored the military radio traffic before and after the shelling occurred" the CPJ determined that the facts suggest that the "attack on the journalists, while not deliberate, was avoidable".  The CPJ determined that the tank thought it was firing upon an Iraqi forward artillery observer when it hit the hotel.  The report went on to say "CPJ has learned that Pentagon officials, as well as commanders on the ground in Baghdad, knew that the Palestine Hotel was full of international journalists and were intent on not hitting it."

A U.S. military investigation in August 2003 cleared Philip DeCamp and the other two soldiers concerned, Sgt. Shawn Gibson and Capt. Philip Wolford, of wrongdoing, saying they acted properly because they believed they were firing on enemy troops. According to the inquiry, American commanders reacted to the tank's firing on the building immediately with anger and consternation, with Lieutenant Colonel DeCamp, the battalion commander, berating Captain Wolford, his subordinate, for giving Sergeant Gibson clearance to fire. However the inquiry never clarified why he or anybody else were unable to prevent the attack from taking place.

A few days after the April incident, DeCamp was quoted in the Los Angeles Times as saying "I'm sorry to say it, but I'm the guy who killed the journalists. I'm really sorry, and I feel badly for their families, but I had no choice. My soldiers' lives were in danger."

In February 2004, the NGO Reporters Without Borders, after undertaking their own investigation, called for the reopening of the inquiry into the incident of 8 April 2003. The NGO stated that the soldiers on the ground, including Philip Wolford, Philip DeCamp and Shawn Gibson, could probably not be held responsible for their lack of information about the function of the Palestine Hotel. Reporters Without Borders, however, demanded that the responsibility of higher commanding levels be investigated, as they withheld the crucial information from their lower ranking officers that the Palestine Hotel was used by journalists.

In 2008, former military intelligence linguist Army Sergeant Adrienne Kinne revealed to Democracy Now! that she had seen secret US military documents that listed the Hotel Palestine as a potential target.

A Spanish judge has indicted three US soldiers in 2009 in the killings: Sergeant Shawn Gibson, Captain Philip Wolford and Lieutenant Colonel Philip DeCamp. The three men were charged with homicide and committing a crime against the international community.

Postwar history 
Being a soft, highly visible target, the hotel periodically came under attack by the Iraqi insurgency. The Palestine was not located in the fortified Green Zone, so it is susceptible to mortar and rocket fire. On October 24, 2005, a cement mixer truck bomb detonated beside the hotel after breaching the defensive wall. The blast destroyed the lobby.

Gallery

See also 
Al Rasheed Hotel
Baghdad Hotel
Ishtar Hotel

References

External links 

 Jose Couso
In Baghdad, lap of luxury isn't all that comfortable
 U.S. Marines Raid the Palestine Hotel in Baghdad: We Go to the Iraqi Capital to Speak with a Reporter Inside the Hotel - DN! 4/16/03
 Hotel Palestine: Killing the Witness - Documentary Exposes Truth Behind the Attack 3/23/05
Fmr. Military Intelligence Sgt. Reveals US Listed Palestine Hotel in Bagdad as Target Prior to Killing of two Journalists in 2003 Democracy Now! May 13, 2008

Organizations based in Baghdad
Hotels in Iraq
Buildings and structures in Baghdad
1982 establishments in Iraq
Hotels established in 1982
Hotel buildings completed in 1982